Bellach railway station is a railway station in the municipality of Bellach, in the Swiss canton of Solothurn. It is an intermediate stop on the standard gauge Jura Foot line of Swiss Federal Railways. The current station opened on 15 December 2013, replacing an older building to the west.

Services
 the following services stop at Bellach:

References

External links 
 
 
 

Railway stations in Switzerland opened in 2013
Railway stations in the canton of Solothurn
Swiss Federal Railways stations